Windischeschenbach is a town in the district of Neustadt an der Waldnaab, in Bavaria, Germany.

Windischeschenbach is generally considered the origin of Zoigl beer.

References

Neustadt an der Waldnaab (district)